Hank Van Sickle (born December 31, 1961 in Pittsburgh, Pennsylvania) is an electric and upright bassist, best known for the blues rock band the Bluesbreakers. He is currently living and working in Los Angeles, California.

Biography
Van Sickle was raised in a family of musicians. His father, Rodney Van Sickle is a classically trained double bassist who graduated from the Curtis Institute of Music and played in the Pittsburgh Symphony Orchestra, the Cleveland Orchestra, and the Toronto Symphony Orchestra. His sister Lucy Van Sickle is a singer and blues harmonica player living in Pittsburgh.

Hank Van Sickle is best known for blues, blues-rock, roots rock, and jazz; he is also experienced in symphonic, rockabilly, world music, rock, americana, pop, folk, country, punk rock, and experimental. He recorded and toured as a member of John Mayall's Bluesbreakers from mid 2000 through the end of 2008. According to John Mayall, the longest tenure of any bass player with the band.

Other credits include Jimmy Smith, Mick Taylor, Robben Ford, Rod Piazza and the Mighty Flyers, Taj Mahal, Candye Kane, Guitar Shorty, Smokey Wilson, American Idol stars tour, Denny Freeman, Don and Dewey, Kirk Fletcher, The Drifters, Rosie Flores, Wanda Jackson, James Intveld, Billy Swan, Yma Sumac, Judy Tenuta, Ray Campi, Floyd Sneed, Beach Cities Symphony, and Friends of Dean Martinez.

Discography

With John Mayall
In the Palace of the King (Eagle Records)
Essentially John Mayall (Eagle Records)
Road Dogs (Eagle Records)
70th Birthday Concert featuring Eric Clapton, Chris Barber and Mick Taylor (Eagle Records) (DVD and CD)
Stories (Eagle Records)
Cookin' Down Under (Private Stash Records) (DVD)
No Days Off (Private Stash Records)

As collaborator
With Friends of Dean Martinez
Retrograde (Sub Pop).
Keep Left, Vol. 1: A Benefit for David Barsamain and Alternative Radio (Go Big)

With Skip Heller
Couch, Los Angeles (Couch 2.0) (Jewbilee)
Career Suicide: The Essential Skip Heller (Dionysus)
Couch, Los Angeles (Mouthpiece/Rounder)
St. Christopher's Arms (Mouthpiece/Rounder)

With Steamin' Stan Ruffo and the Instigators
Jump On This! (Sho' Nuff)
Blues On Tap, Volume One (Sho' Nuff)
Santa Cruz Blues (Bluestraxx)
More Desaster City Blues (Taxim)

With others
Rod Piazza and the Mighty Flyers: Almighty Dollar (Delta Groove)
Todd Rundgren: Todd Rundgren Reconstructed (Cleopatra)
Wyland Blues Planet Band: Blues Planet I (Wyland Records)
Wyland Blues Planet Band: Blues Planet II (Wyland Records)
Ian Whitcomb and Skip Heller: Barenstark Bear Essentials (Bear Family)
Ian Whitcomb: Songs Without Words (Rivermont)
Barry Levenson: The Late Show (Rip Cat Records)
Barry Levenson: The Visit (Rip Cat Records)
Barry Levenson featuring Johnny Dyer: Hard Times Won (Storyville)
The Blue Dahlia: A Tribute to Frank Sinatra (Cleopatra)
Sugaray: Blind Alley (www.sugarayblues.com)
Lisa Finnie: Lisa Finnie (Chirp)
Dennis Herrera Blues Band: Blues Well Done! (JulDen)
Joe Gorfinkle: Take a Chance (Self Produced)
Rocky Jackson: Testify! (High Life Records)
Bob Pacemaker Newham and the Blue Vanguards: So Cal Barbeque (Self Produced)
Gedina Jean Bergstrom: Introducing Gedina Jean (Self Produced)
Indigo Triangle: Code of the Heart (Mountain Castle Music)
Claudia Russell: Ready to Receive (Radio Rhythm Records)
Anny Celsi: Little Black Dress & Other Stories (Ragazza Music)
Rip Masters: Big Red '57 (Rattler)
Rudy Rotta: Some of My Favorite Songs For... (Sling Slang)
Billy Sheets: Please Tell Me Why (Big Clock)
Dennis Spencer: They Call Me The Tall Guy (Tall Guy Music)
Farina: Shots in the Dark (Del-Fi)
Edwing Sankey: Trapdoor (Positone)

References

External links

Hank Van Sickle website
Hank Van Sickle Pittsburgh Music History

Guitarists from California
American blues guitarists
American male guitarists
American rhythm and blues musicians
John Mayall & the Bluesbreakers members
American jazz bass guitarists
American male bass guitarists
American jazz double-bassists
American session musicians
American rock bass guitarists
American rock double-bassists
Male double-bassists
1961 births
Living people
American alternative rock musicians
Rounder Records artists
Sub Pop artists
Alternative rock bass guitarists
20th-century American guitarists
21st-century double-bassists
American male jazz musicians
Eagle Records artists